Yevgeny Smiryagin (born 17 May 1976) is a Russian track and field athlete. He competed in the men's pole vault at the 2000 Summer Olympics.

References

1976 births
Living people
Place of birth missing (living people)
Russian male pole vaulters
Olympic male pole vaulters
Olympic athletes of Russia
Athletes (track and field) at the 2000 Summer Olympics
World Athletics Championships athletes for Russia
Russian Athletics Championships winners